Bitame Lucia International School (BLIS) provides the preschool and the primary bilingual school (English and French) in Nkolfoulou village located 12 km from Yaoundé, Cameroon. The school was founded in February 2009 by the teacher Lucia Bitame and managing director Ajomuzu Collette Bekaku, founder of the Cameroon Association for the Protection and Education of the Child (CAPEC).

History 
The school started in February 2009 with the help of international volunteers from United Kingdom, Netherlands, etc. 
On 20 November 2012 was opened a new classroom constructed with the help of US Embassy Ambassador's Program.
In 2014 after the crowdfunding at Indiegogo was built a new concrete 3-floor school building. Beside classrooms the school has a big hall where are organized various events for students and their parents. On 29 September 2016 Brazilian Ambassador Dr. Nei Futuro Bitencourt visited BLIS and gave a lesson about Brazil to Bitame Lucia International College students.

International volunteers and sponsors 
The school offers teaching opportunities for international volunteers. Partners and sponsors include Busuu, Develop Africa, Google, OLPC, etc.

References

External links 

School website

Primary schools in Cameroon